The 2014 NCAA Division III baseball tournament was played at the end of the 2014 NCAA Division III baseball season to determine the 39th national champion of college baseball at the NCAA Division III level. The tournament concluded with eight teams competing at Neuroscience Group Field at Fox Cities Stadium in Grand Chute, Wisconsin for the championship. Eight regional tournaments were held to determine the participants in the World Series. Regional tournaments were contested in double-elimination format, with four regions consisting of six teams, and four consisting of eight, for a total of 56 teams participating in the tournament.

Bids
The 56 competing teams were:

By team

By conference

Regionals
Bold indicates winner.

Central Regional
Brunner Field in the Duane R. Swanson Stadium-Moline, IL (Host: Augustana College (Illinois))

West Regional
Roy Helser Field and Jim Wright Stadium-McMinnville, OR (Host: Linfield College)

Mid-Atlantic Regional
PNC Field-Moosic, PA (Host: Misericordia University)

South Regional
Loudermilk Field-Demorest, GA (Host: Piedmont College)

New York Regional
Colburn Park-Newark, NY (Host: Ithaca College)

Mideast Regional
Schaly Stadium-Marietta, OH (Host: Marietta College)

New England Regional
Whitehouse Field-Harwich, MA (Host: Eastern College Athletic Conference)

Midwest Regional
Prucha Field at James B. Miller Stadium-Whitewater, WI (Host: University of Wisconsin-Whitewater)

World Series
Neuroscience Group Field at Fox Cities Stadium-Grand Chute, WI (Host: University of Wisconsin-Oshkosh/Lawrence University/Fox Cities Convention and Visitors Bureau)

References

NCAA Division III Baseball Tournament
2014 college baseball season